This family is a putative regulatory RNA structure that is found upstream of the ylbH gene in B. subtilis and related low GC Gram-positive bacteria.

See also 
Leader sequence
Riboswitch

References

External links 
 

Cis-regulatory RNA elements